Lesticus fukiensis is a species of ground beetle in the subfamily Pterostichinae. It was described by Jedlicka in 1956.

References

Lesticus
Beetles described in 1956